The Committee for Private Education (CPE) is an agency under the SkillsFuture Singapore (SSG) and was previously a statutory board under the Ministry of Education (MOE) of  Singapore. The Singapore Workforce Development Agency and Council for Private Education was restructured to form SSG on 3 October 2016.

Previously established under the Private Education Act, the CPE was sanctioned with the legislative power to regulate the private education sector in Singapore. Now, the CPE is appointed by the SSG Board to carry out its functions and powers relating to private education under the Private Education Act. The CPE is supported by a team of dedicated staff from SSG to regulate the sector, provide student services, consumer education and facilitate capability development efforts to uplift standards in the local private education industry. The regulatory initiative continues to comprise the mandatory Enhanced Registration Framework (ERF) which sets out the basic standards that a Private Education Institution (PEI) would need to adhere to in order to operate.

While private schools are required to register with the CPE, this is not an endorsement or accreditation of the school. Employers, organisations and individuals are to discrete the various school qualifications for recognition and acceptance purposes.

EduTrust Certification Scheme
The EduTrust Certification Scheme (EduTrust) is a quality assurance scheme that differentiate private schools according to their quality in education and improvements leading to a good education outcome. There are 7 criteria that the scheme covers, with 3 types of Certification Awards.

History 
In September 2009, the Private Education Act was passed in the Parliament of Singapore with the aim of strengthening and levelling up the quality of the private education sector through an enhanced registration framework and enforcement. The Act also provided for the establishment of the Committee for Private Education (CPE) to oversee a new regulatory function. The CPE began its operations on 21 December 2009.

Comparison of PEIs with AUs

Graduate Employment Survey
On 15 November 2017, the CPE released the results of its Private Education Institution (PEI) Graduate Employment Survey (GES). Key Findings of PEI GES between 2015 and 2016 showed that the overall employment rate of Private School graduates was 84.3% with full-time permanent employment at 60.1%. This result differs from the Autonomous University (AU) graduates at 89.6% and 79.9% respectively. Subsequently, the median salary of Private School graduates were $2,550 as compared to AU graduates at $3,325. Polytechnic graduates who completed National Service was paid $2,180 and $2,517 respectively.

In 2018, graduates of private education institutes achieved a 47% full-time employment rate in comparison with 78.4% for their peers from three autonomous universities - the National University of Singapore (NUS), Nanyang Technological University (NTU) and Singapore Management University (SMU). This result is lower than post-national service polytechnic graduates whose full-time employment rate was 64%. The response rate to the survey was more than 32% in the previous year. It also revealed that private graduates earned median gross starting salaries of $2,650 a month, while NUS, NTU and SMU graduates earned $3,400. Post-NS polytechnic graduates earned $2,480 a month.

Commentaries
In Oct 2017, Dr Sam Choon Yin, the dean of PSB Academy wrote in a commentary that private education providers need to remove the impression of second chance providers of education while offering more chances to individuals. In a Feb 2018 interview, Mr Dr Lee Kwok Cheong, CEO of SIM Holdings refers to SIM as a second-chance university for late bloomers to succeed.

References

External links
 

2009 establishments in Singapore
Government agencies established in 2009
Organizations established in 2009
Statutory boards of the Singapore Government